

Flora

Cycads

Dinosaurs
Data courtesy of George Olshevsky's dinosaur genera list.

Newly named dinosaurs

Newly named birds

Plesiosaurs

New taxa

Synapsids

Non-mammalian

References

 
Paleontology
Paleontology 6